Muhammad Mahdi Al-Jawahiri (26 July 1899 – 27 July 1997) was an Iraqi poet. Considered by many as one of the best and greatest Arabian poets in the 20th century, he was also nicknamed The Greatest Arabian Poet, and is considered to be the national poet of Iraq.

Life
Muhammad Mahdi Al-Jawahiri was born in 1899 in Najaf in Iraq. His father, 'Abd al-Husayn was a religious scholar among the clergy in Najaf who wanted his son to be a cleric as well. So he dressed him in an cleric's 'Abaya and turban at the age of ten. The origin of “Al-Jawahiri” goes back to his Najafi, Iraqi family. Since the 11th century Hijri (15th century CE), the most famous people have inhabited Najaf, and individuals named al-Najafi have earned the title “Bejeweled” (or al-Jawahiri) for their relationship to the book of fiqh values (religious scholarship) which one of his family's ancestors Shaykh Muhammad Hasan al-Najafi had written. The books were called “the jewel of speech in explaining the laws of Islam” and was composed of 44 volumes. Afterwards he was known as the “owner of the jewels,” and his family came to be called “bejeweled” (al-Jawahiri).

Al-Jawahiri read the Qur'an and did not memorize it at an early age. Then his father sent him to great teachers to teach him reading, writing, grammar, rhetoric and jurisprudence. His father and others planned for him to learn speech from Nahj al-Balagha and poetry from the works of Abu Tayyib al-Mutanabi.

Learning was organized at an early age and even in his childhood Al-Jawahiri displayed an inclination for literature. He began to read the Book of Eloquence and Demonstration by Al-Jahiz and the Muqaddimah by Ibn Khaldun, and collections of poetry. It was early in his life when he first wore the clothing of a religious man and he participated in the 1920 revolution against the British authorities.

In 1928, Al-Jawahiri published the volume "Between Feelings and Emotions," his first poetry collection which he had been preparing since 1924 to distribute under the title "The Dangers of Poetry in Love, Nation and Ode." He then worked for a short period in the court of King Faysal I when he was crowned king of Iraq  and when he was still wearing the turban of a cleric. Afterwards, Al-Jawahiri left the clergy as well as his work in Faysal's court. After he left Najaf for Baghdad, he went to work in the press, and put out a group of papers – among them Al-Furat (The Euphrates), Al-Inqilab (The Coup), and Al-Ra'i al-'Am (The Common View). He was elected head of the union of Iraqi writers on several occasions.

His brother Jaafar was killed during the Al-Wathbah uprising of 1948, which inspired one of his most famous poems, "My Brother Jaafar." He recited the poem at Haydarkhana mosque to an audience of Sunnis, Shia and Jews during the same month of the massacre. A verse from the poem, "Do you know or do you not know/ that the wounds of victims are a mouth?" became an icon of modern Iraqi poetry.

See also
 Iraqi art
 List of Iraqi artists

References

External links
 Muhammad Mahdi Al-Jawahiri Network
 Muhammad Mahdi Al-Jawahiri Center
My Brother Jaafar in Arabic

1899 births
1997 deaths
20th-century Iraqi poets
People from Najaf
Iraqi Shia Muslims
20th-century poets